François-Joseph de Champagny, 4th Duke of Cadore (8 September 1804, Vienna – 4 May 1882 Paris) was a French author and historian. He was the thirteenth member elected to occupy seat 4 of the Académie française in 1869.

References
 

1804 births
1882 deaths
Austrian emigrants to France
19th-century French writers
Members of the Académie Française
French male non-fiction writers
 4
19th-century French historians
19th-century French male writers